Guo Nanhong may refer to:
Joseph Kuo (born 1936), Taiwanese filmmaker
Kuo Nan-hung (1936–2023), Taiwanese electrical engineer, academic administrator, and politician